, literally the water trade, is the euphemism for jobs that do not provide a contractually fixed salary, but instead, rely on the popularity of the performer among their fans or clientele. Broadly, it includes the television, theater, and movie industries, but more narrowly, it can refer to those who work in businesses that serve alcohol or sex work.

Etymology
While the actual origin of the term   is debatable, it is likely the term came into use during the Tokugawa shogunate (1603–1868). The Tokugawa period saw the development of large bathhouses and an expansive network of roadside inns offering "hot baths and sexual release", as well as the expansion of geisha districts and courtesan quarters in cities and towns throughout the country.

In the entertainment business, income depends on a large number of fickle factors like popularity among customers, the weather, and the state of the economy; success and failure change as rapidly as the flow of water. The , on the other hand, notes that the term may derive from the expression , for earning a living in the red-light districts, or from the Edo-period expression  for a public teahouse.

See also
 Businesses Affecting Public Morals Regulation Act
 Host and hostess clubs
 Kyabakura Union
 Prostitution in Japan
 Sexuality in Japan

References

Japanese sex terms
Sexuality in Japan
Euphemisms
Japanese words and phrases